The House of Burgundy was a cadet branch of the Capetian dynasty, descending from Robert I, Duke of Burgundy, a younger son of King Robert II of France. The House ruled the Duchy of Burgundy from 1032–1361 and achieved the recognized title of King of Portugal.

The last member of the House was Philip of Rouvres, who succeeded his grandfather in 1349. Philip died childless in 1361 and the duchy reverted to his liege, who two years later created his son the new duke of Burgundy, thus beginning the Younger House of Burgundy.

Notable members of the main line of the House of Burgundy include:
 Robert I, Duke of Burgundy
 Henry, Count of Portugal, father of the first Portuguese King Afonso Henriques
 Hugh III, Duke of Burgundy
 Odo IV, Duke of Burgundy
 Margaret of Burgundy, the first wife and Queen of Louis X of France
 Joan the Lame, the first wife and Queen of Philip VI of France
 Philip I, Duke of Burgundy

The Portuguese Branch

The Portuguese House of Burgundy was the Portuguese cadet house of the House of Burgundy, founded by Henry, Count of Portugal in 1093. The senior legitimate line went extinct with the death of King Ferdinand I of Portugal in 1383, but two illegitimate lines, the Houses of Aviz and Braganza, continued to rule in Portugal and, later, Brazil, with interruptions, until 1910 and 1889 respectively.

Genealogy

House of Burgundy

 Robert II of France (972–1031)
 Hugh Magnus (1007–1025)
 Henry I of France (1008–1060)
  House of Capet
 Robert I, Duke of Burgundy (1011–1076)
 Hugh (1034–1060)
 Henry of Burgundy (1035–1066)
 Hugh I, Duke of Burgundy (1057–1093)
 Odo I, Duke of Burgundy (1058–1103)
 Hugh II, Duke of Burgundy (1084–1143)
 Odo II, Duke of Burgundy (1118–1162)
  Hugh III, Duke of Burgundy (1148–1192)
 Odo III, Duke of Burgundy (1166–1218)
  Hugh IV, Duke of Burgundy (1213–1272)
 Odo, Count of Nevers (1230–1269)
 John, Count of Charolais, Lord of Bourbon (1231–1268)
 Robert II, Duke of Burgundy (1248–1306)
 Jean (1279–1283)
 Hugh V, Duke of Burgundy (1294–1315)
 Odo IV, Duke of Burgundy (1295–1349)
 Philip II, Count of Auvergne (1323–1346)
  Philip I, Duke of Burgundy (1346–1361)
  John (1325–1328)
 Louis, King of Thessalonica (1297–1316)
  Robert, Count of Tonnerre (1302–1334)
  Hugh, Lord of Montréal and Viscount of Avallon (1260–1288)
 Alexandre, Lord of Montagu (1170 † 1205)
  Lords of Montagu
  Guigues VI of Viennois (1184 † 1237)
 Guigues VII of Viennois (1225–1270)
 John I, Dauphin of Viennois (1264–1282)
  Andrew (1267-aft.1270)
  John (1227–1239)
 Gauthier, Archbishop of Besançon (1120–1180)
 Hugh le Roux, Lord of Navilly (1121–1171)
  Guillaume
 Robert, Bishop of Autun (1122–1140)
 Henry, Lord of Flavigny, Bishop of Autun (1124–1170)
  Raymond, Lord of Grignon and Montpensier (1125–1156)
  Hugues (1147–1156)
  Henry (1087–1131)
 Robert, Bishop of Langres (1059–1111)
 Reginald, Abbot of Saint-Pierre de Flavigny (1065–1092)
  Henry, Count of Portugal (1066–1112)
  Portuguese House of Burgundy
 Robert (1040–1113)
  Simon (1044–1088)
  Odo (1013–c.1056)

Montagu branch

 Alexandre, Lord of Montagu (1170 † 1205)
 Eudes I, Lord of Montagu (1196–1245)
 Alexandre II, Lord of Bussy (1221–1249)
 Guillaume I, Lord of Montagu (1222–1300)
 Alexandre III, Lord of Sombernon (1250–1296)
 Etienne I, Lord of Sombernon (1273–1315)
 Etienne II, Lord of Sombernon (1296–1339)
 Guillaume II, Lord of Sombernon (1320–1350)
 Jean, Lord of Sombernon (1341–1410)
  Catherine, Lady of Sombernon and Malain (1365-aft. 1431)
  Pierre, Lord of Malain (1343–1419)
 Pierre I, Lord of Malain (1322-)
  Etienne, priest (1345–1367)
  Hugues, monk (1324-aft. 1359)
  Philibert I, Lord of Couches (1300-aft. 1362)
  Hugues de Montagu, Lord of Couches (1325-)
 Jean de Montagu, (1346–1382)
 Philibert II, Lord of Couches (1348–1406)
 Jean II, Lord of Couches (1380-aft. 1435)
  Claude, Lord of Couches (1404–1471)
  Odot (−1406)
 Hugues (1351-aft. 1380)
  Alexandre, abbot of Flavigny (−1417)
 Guillaume (1276-aft. 1313)
  Eudes, Lord of Marigny-le-Cahouet (1290–1349)
 Girard, Lord of Montoillot (1332-aft. 1367)
 Jean, Lord of Montoillot (1363-aft. 1410)
  Oudot (1365–1400)
  Guillaume, Lord of Marigny (1335-aft. 1380)
  Oudard, Lord of Montagu (1264-aft. 1333)
 Henri, Lord of Montagu (1306–1349)
  Oudard, monk at Reims (1312–1340)
 Philippe, Lord of Chagny (1227-aft. 1277)
 Gaucher, Lord of Jambles (1230-aft. 1255)
  Eudes, Lord of Cortiambles (1231-aft. 1255)
 Alexandre, Bishop of Chalon-sur-Saône (1201–1261)
  Girard, Lord of Gergy (1203-aft.1222)

Arms

See also
Dukes of Burgundy family tree
House of Valois-Burgundy

References

 
Capetian dynasty
Roman Catholic families
1139 establishments in Europe
1383 disestablishments in Europe